Busy Bee Cafe is the second solo album of country singer Marty Stuart. Unlike his debut solo album, this project contains original material by Stuart, including the title track, 'Boogie For Clarence' and 'Long Train Gone'.

The album also pays tribute to the people with whom Stuart honed his craft as a musician; with songs written by Lester Flatt, Earl Scruggs, Bill Monroe, and Johnny Cash (Cash appears as a guest performer on 'One More Ride', 'Hey Porter' and 'Get In Line, Brother'), as well as Stuart's own 'Boogie For Clarence', which was written for country guitar icon Clarence White. Stuart would later record another tribute to White on his 2010 album Ghost Train: The Studio B Sessions with the instrumental track 'Hummingbyrd', which was recorded with White's Fender Telecaster which he purchased from Clarence's daughter. Michelle
Jason Ankeny of Allmusic praised the album as "a loose, jam-oriented record".

Track listing

Personnel
 Johnny Cash - rhythm guitar and duet vocals on tracks 1, 7, and 9
 T. Michael Coleman - bass guitar
 Jerry Douglas - dobro
 Jack Grochmal - percussion
 Carl Jackson - banjo, rhythm guitar, background vocals
 Alan O'Bryant - background vocals
 Earl Scruggs - banjo, background vocals
 Marty Stuart - rhythm guitar, mandolin, lead vocals
 Doc Watson - rhythm guitar, harmonica
 Merle Watson - rhythm guitar, slide guitar

References

Albums produced by Marty Stuart
Marty Stuart albums
1982 albums
Sugar Hill Records albums